Batch is the second album by American punk rock band Big Drill Car. It was released in 1991.

It was the last studio recording with the original line-up, and their last album distributed by Cruz Records. "Freedom of Choice" is a cover of the Devo song.

Critical reception

Trouser Press wrote that "Batch upholds the group’s stylistic consistency: riffs, tunes and punchy rhythms collide in an enjoyable blend of big rock, vampy thrashfunk and nicely detailed pop that hardly belongs on a punk-rooted indie label." The Los Angeles Times wrote that "there is no denying the clean, unrelenting crunch that guitarist Mark Arnold, bassist Bob Thomson and drummer Danny Marcroft achieve as they find hard-rocking middle ground between Led Zeppelin and Husker Du."

Track listing
 "Take Away" (Arnold, Daly, Smooth, Thomson) - 2:38
 "Restless Habs" (Arnold, Daly, Thomson) - 2:51
 "If It's Poison" (Daly) - 2:59
 "Freep" (Arnold, Daly, Thomson) - 3:30
 "Never Ending Endeavor" (Daly, Thomson) - 2:48
 "In a Hole" (Daly) - 2:23
 "Crust" (Daly, Thomson) - 1:51
 "Freedom of Choice" (Mothersbaugh, Casale) - 2:35
 "Ick" (Arnold, Daly, Thomson) - 2:37
 "Faster" (Daly) - 5:26

Credits 
Frank Daly - Vocals 
Mark Arnold - Guitar 
Bob Thomson - Bass, album art
Danny Marcroft - Drums, background vocals
Rich Cranium - Guitar solo on 'Ick'
Additional personnel
Bill Stevenson - Producer 
Stephen Egerton - Engineer, Producer
Anthony Arvizu - Assistant Engineer, Second Engineer 
Steve McNeil - Assistant Engineer, Second Engineer
 Recorded and Mixed at Mambo Sound and Recording, Long Beach, CA

References

1991 albums
Big Drill Car albums
Cruz Records albums
Albums produced by Bill Stevenson (musician)